Chaenactis stevioides, with the common names Esteve's pincushion and desert pincushion, is a species of flowering plant in the daisy family. It is also sometimes called false yarrow or broad-leaved Chaenactis.

Description
The stems are hairy with cobwebby fibers which thin with age.

The plant blooms from March to June. The inflorescence bears several flower heads on a tall peduncle. Each head is lined with rigid, hairy and glandular phyllaries and filled with white, pink, or pale yellow disk flowers, the ones in the middle smaller and somewhat tubular, and the ones nearer to the edge larger and open-faced, resembling ray florets. The fruit is a hairy achene with a pappus of four scales.

Distribution and habitat 
Esteve's pincushion is native to California and the Great Basin of the United States and the southwestern deserts extending into Mexico, where it grows in open arid and semiarid habitat. According to Flora of North America, it is "among the most abundant spring wildflowers in the higher Mojave Desert and southern Great Basin." It is also found in the southern California chaparral and woodlands habitats.

References

External links

Calflora Database: Chaenactis stevioides (Esteve pincushion)
Jepson Manual eFlora (TJM2) treatment of Chaenactis stevioides
USDA Plants Profile:  Chaenactis stevioides

stevioides
Flora of the Western United States
Flora of the California desert regions
Flora of the Great Basin
Flora of the Sonoran Deserts
Flora of California
Natural history of the Colorado Desert
Natural history of the Mojave Desert
Natural history of the Peninsular Ranges
Natural history of the Transverse Ranges
Flora without expected TNC conservation status